The Tents of Allah is a 1923 American silent drama film written and directed by Charles A. Logue and starring Monte Blue, Mary Alden, and Frank Currier.

Synopsis
While visiting her uncle, the American consul in Tangier, Morocco, a young woman offends a powerful Sultan whose henchman kidnap her.

Cast

Preservation
With no prints of The Tents of Allah located in any film archives, it is a lost film.

References

Bibliography
 Munden, Kenneth White. The American Film Institute Catalog of Motion Pictures Produced in the United States, Part 1. University of California Press, 1997.

External links

1923 films
1923 drama films
Silent American drama films
American silent feature films
1920s English-language films
American black-and-white films
Films directed by Charles A. Logue
Films set in Tangier
Associated Exhibitors films
1920s American films